Trabecula krumpermani is a species of sea snail, a marine gastropod mollusk in the family Pyramidellidae, the pyrams and their allies.

Description
The shell grows to a length of 8.6 mm.

Distribution
This marine species occurs off Curacao; in the Atlantic Ocean off Brazil: Pernambuco, Bahia, Abrolhos Archipelago, Espirito Santo, Rio de Janeiro.

References

External links
 To Encyclopedia of Life
 To World Register of Marine Species

Pyramidellidae
Gastropods described in 1988